Villarboit is a comune (municipality) in the Province of Vercelli in the Italian region Piedmont, located about  northeast of Turin and about  northwest of Vercelli.

It is included in the Lame del Sesia Natural Park.

References

Cities and towns in Piedmont